This is a list of rivers of the U.S. state of Tennessee:

By drainage basin 
This list is arranged by drainage basin, with respective tributaries indented under each larger stream's name.  All rivers in Tennessee ultimately flow to the Gulf of Mexico.

Mississippi River Drainage Basin 
Mississippi River
Lake McKellar
Nonconnah Creek
Wolf River
Loosahatchie River
Hatchie River
Tuscumbia River
Forked Deer River
North Fork
Middle Fork
South Fork
Obion River
North Fork
Middle Fork
South Fork
Rutherford Fork

Ohio River (KY)
Tennessee River
Blood River
Big Sandy River
White Oak Creek
Duck River
Buffalo River
Green River
Little Buffalo River
Piney River
Defeated Creek
Little Duck River
Beech River
Indian Creek
Smith Fork
Shoal Creek/Sycamore River
Elk River
Richland Creek
Flint River
Sequatchie River
Little Sequatchie River
Hiwassee River
Ocoee River
Conasauga Creek
Piney River
Soak Creek 
Little Piney Creek
Sewee Creek 

Clinch River
Emory River
Little Emory River
Obed River
Little Obed River
Poplar Creek
East Fork Poplar Creek
Beaver Creek
Coal Creek
Powell River
Sweetwater Creek 
Little Tennessee River
Tellico River
Bald River
North River
Little River
French Broad River
Little Pigeon River
Nolichucky River
Pigeon River

Holston River
North Fork Holston River
South Fork Holston River
Watauga River
Doe River
Little Doe River
Elk River
Roan Creek

Cumberland River
Red River
Harpeth River
Little Harpeth River
Otter Creek
Richland Creek
Mill Creek
Sevenmile Creek
Stones River
Overall Creek
Plunkett Creek
Caney Fork
Hickman Creek
Smith Fork Creek
Clear Fork
Saunders Fork
Indian Creek
Little Indian Creek
Mine Lick Creek
Falling Water River
Collins River
Barren Fork
Rocky River
Calfkiller River
Cane Creek
Defeated Creek
Dillard Creek
Little Indian Creek
Martin Creek
Flynn Creek
Jennings Creek
Roaring RiverBlackburn Fork RiverSpring CreekObey RiverWolf RiverRotten Fork Wolf RiverEast Fork Obey RiverWest Fork Obey RiverBig South Fork of the Cumberland RiverClear ForkNew RiverClear Fork (Cumberland River tributary)Stinking Creek Mobile River Drainage Basin Mobile River (AL)Alabama River (AL)Coosa River (AL, GA)Oostanaula River (GA)''
Conasauga River

Alphabetically 

Bald River
Barren Fork
Beaver Creek
Beech River
Big Sandy River
Big South Fork of the Cumberland River
Blackburn Fork River
Blood River
Buffalo River
Calfkiller River
Cane Creek (Caney Fork River tributary)
Caney Fork
Clear Fork (Big South Fork Cumberland River tributary)
Clear Fork (Cumberland River tributary)
Clear Fork (Smith Fork Creek tributary)
Chickamauga Creek
Clinch River
Coal Creek
Collins River
Conasauga Creek
Conasauga River
Cumberland River
Defeated Creek (Hickman County, Tennessee)
Defeated Creek (Smith County, Tennessee)
Doe River
Duck River
East Fork Poplar Creek
Elk River (North Carolina - Tennessee), tributary of the Watauga River
Elk River (Tennessee), tributary of the Tennessee River
Emory River
Falling Water River
Flint River
Forked Deer River
French Broad River
Green River
Harpeth River
Hatchie River
Hickman Creek
Hiwassee River
Holston River
Indian Creek (Caney Fork River tributary)
Indian Creek (Tennessee River tributary)
Injun Creek
Little Buffalo River
Little Doe River
Little Duck River
Little Emory River
Little Harpeth River
Little Indian Creek
Little Obed River
Little Pigeon River
Little Piney Creek
Little River
Little Sequatchie River
Little Tennessee River
Loosahatchie River
Louse Creek
Mill Creek
Mine Lick Creek
Mississippi River
New River
Nolichucky River
Nonconnah Creek
North River
Obed River
Obey River
Obion River
Ocoee River
Otter Creek
Overall Creek
Pigeon River
Piney River (East Tennessee)
Piney River (Middle Tennessee)
Plunkett Creek
Poplar Creek
Powell River
Red River
Roan Creek
Roaring River
Rocky River
Rotten Fork Wolf River
Soak Creek 
Sequatchie River
Sevenmile Creek
Sewee Creek
Shoal Creek
Smith Fork
Smith Fork Creek
Spring Creek
Stinking Creek
Stones River
Sweetwater Creek
Tellico River
Tennessee River
Tuscumbia River
Watauga River
White Oak Creek
Wolf River (Middle Tennessee), tributary of the Obey River
Wolf River (West Tennessee), tributary of the Mississippi River

See also 

List of rivers in the United States

References 

USGS Geographic Names Information Service
USGS Hydrologic Unit Map - State of Tennessee (1974)

Tennessee
 
Rivers